The Municipality of Veržej is a small municipality in northeastern Slovenia. The seat of the municipality is the town of Veržej. It lies on the right bank of the Mura River. The area is part of the traditional region of Styria. The municipality is now included in the Mura Statistical Region. It is known for fields of white narcisi that bloom in the area in springtime.

Settlements
In addition to the municipal seat of Veržej, the municipality also includes the settlements of Banovci and Bunčani.

References

External links

Municipality of Veržej at Geopedia
Veržej municipal site

 
Verzej
1998 establishments in Slovenia